Tizak is the name of two distinct villages.
Tizak, Iran
Tizak, Afghanistan